This is a list of venues used for professional baseball in the Dallas–Fort Worth Metroplex, which consists of Dallas–Fort Worth–Arlington. The information is a compilation of the information contained in the references listed.

Dallas
Gaston Park a.k.a. "the fair grounds"
Home of: 
Dallas Browns – Texas League (1884 only)
Dallas Hams/Tigers – Texas League (1888–1890)
Dallas Sullivan's Steers – Texas League (1895)
Dallas Navigators/Steers/Scrappers/Colts – Texas Southern League/Texas League 1896, TL (1897 – 1898 part season)
Dallas Steers/Giants – Texas League (1902–1914)
Location: Parry Avenue (west, first base); Second Avenue (southwest, right field)
Currently: the site of the Texas State Fairgrounds Music Hall

Gardner Park (I)
Home of:
Dallas Marines/Submarines/Steers – Texas League (1915 – mid–1924)
Dallas Black Giants - Negro leagues
Location: Colorado Boulevard (north, third base); North Fleming Avenue (east, left field); North Jefferson Avenue (west, first base); Comal Street (south, right field)

Burnett Field orig. Gardner Park (II) a.k.a. Steers Park, Rebels Park, Eagles Stadium 
Home of:
Dallas Steers/Rebels/Eagles/Rangers – Texas League (mid–1924 – 1942, 1946–1958)
Dallas Rangers – American Association (1959)
Dallas–Fort Worth Rangers – American Association (1960–1962) / Pacific Coast League (1963) split–schedule with LaGrave Field
Dallas Rangers – PCL 1964
Location: 1500 East Jefferson Boulevard (west, home plate), Brazos Street (north, left field); Colorado Boulevard (south, right field); Trinity River (east, center field); across the street from the original
Currently: vacant lot

Riverside Park
Home of:
Dallas Black Giants - Negro leagues
Dallas Steers - Texas League - one game in 1924 after Gardner Park (I) fire
Location: Comal Street (north, left field); Trinity River (northeast, center field); North Denley Drive (southeast, right field corner); Sabine Street (now Reverend CBT Smith Street) (south, first base); Cliff Street (west, third base)
Currently: Eloise Lundy Park

Cotton Bowl
Home of: Dallas Eagles – TL (1950 opening game only)
Location: 1300 Robert B. Cullum Boulevard, within Texas State Fairgrounds

Fort Worth

unnamed ballpark
Home of:
Fort Worth Panthers – Texas League (1888–90, 92 part season)
Fort Worth Panthers – Texas Southern League (1895) reorganized as Texas League (1896–1898)
Location: Jennings Avenue between West Front Street (now West Lancaster Avenue) and Railroad Avenue (now Rio Grand Avenue) 
– originally east of Jennings; rebuilt west of Jennings in 1890
Currently: post office (east of Jennings); railroad warehouse (west of Jennings)

Haines Park
Home of Fort Worth Panthers – Texas League (1902–1910)
Location: Pine Street (west, first base); Pacific Street (now Presidio Street) (north, third base) (per city directories and Jan 31, 1926, newspaper article)
Currently: city bus parking and storage

Panther Park (I) orig. Morris Park
Home of: Fort Worth Panthers – Texas League (1911–1925)
Location: North Throckmorton Street (northeast, third base); Northwest 6th Street (southeast, left field); Northwest 7th Street (northwest, first base); railroad tracks (southwest, right field) (per a 1910 map and a 1925 news article) - five short blocks southwest of the eventual site of LaGrave Field
Currently: commercial businesses

LaGrave Field orig. Panther Park (II) 
Home of:
Fort Worth Panthers/Cats – Texas League (1926–1942, 1946–1958)
Fort Worth Cats – American Association (1959)
Dallas–Fort Worth Rangers – American Association (1960–1962) / Pacific Coast League (1963) split–schedule with Burnett Field
Fort Worth Cats – Texas League (1964 only) 
Fort Worth Cats – Central Baseball League (2002–2005) / American Association (2006–2011) / North American League (2012) / United League Baseball (2013–2014)
Location: 301 NE 6th Street (southeast, right field); North Jones Street line (southwest, first base); Northeast 7th Street (northwest, third base); Trinity River (northeast, left field) 
Currently: abandoned, but still standing as of 2021

Lon Goldstein Field
Home of: Fort Worth Cats – Central Baseball League (2001 only)
Location: Joe B. Rushing Road (north, left field), beyond which is Rolling Hills Park; C.A. Roberson Boulevard (west, third base), across which is Tarrant County College South Campus; athletic facilities and the football stadium, and then Interstate Highway 20 (south, first base); and soccer fields and Wichita Street (east, right field)

Arlington

Arlington Stadium orig. Turnpike Stadium
Home of:
Dallas–Fort Worth Spurs – Texas League (1965–1971) (aka Dixie Association 1971 only)
Texas Rangers – American League (1972–1993)
Location: 1500 East Copeland Road (north, first base); Stadium Drive (east, left field); East Road to Six Flags Street (south, right field); Nolan Ryan Expressway (west/southwest, first base); just west of Six Flags Over Texas
Currently: Parking lots

Globe Life Park in Arlington prev. The Ballpark in Arlington, Ameriquest Field in Arlington, and Rangers Ballpark in Arlington
Home of: Texas Rangers – AL (1994–2019)
Location: 1000 Ballpark Way, near the site of Arlington Stadium; East Road to Six Flags Street (north, third base); Stadium Drive (east, left field); East Randol Mill Road (south, right field); Nolan Ryan Expressway (west, first base)
Currently: Converted into a football stadium

Globe Life Field
Home of: Texas Rangers – AL (2020–present)
Also used as a neutral site in the 2020 MLB postseason including the 2020 World Series
Location: Across the street to the south and west from Globe Life Park in Arlington; east of the NFL stadium; East Randol Mill Road (north, left field); Stadium Drive (east, right field); Cowboys Way (south, first base)

See also
Lists of baseball parks

References
Peter Filichia, Professional Baseball Franchises, Facts on File, 1993.

External links
1889 Sanborn map showing part of Fort Worth ballpark

Dallas, Texas

baseball parks
baseball parks